During the 1948-49 'Associazione Calcio Torino competed in Serie A.

Summary 
The season is remembered  by  Superga air disaster
, on 4 May ending the Grande Torino era. After clinching 4 consecutive titles the Granata were ready to win the 5th title at top of the league table. 4 rounds before the ending of championship Grande Torino traveled to Lisboa, to play a friendly match against Benfica due to retirement of Francisco Ferreira. Game which Toro lost 4–3. Torino was named winner of the championship  by  the Federation, and the Youth squad was able to play the last 4 rounds.
Finished a short summer interval from the end of previous season, competition officially resumed in Italy after the 1948 Summer Olympics. Prematurely eliminated, Vittorio Pozzo lost his position as sole commissioner of the Italy national team and Ferruccio Novo took his place.

New season began in mid-September with a Torino almost identical to that of the previous championships; there was only Franco Ossola permanently in place of Pietro Ferraris, who, at age 36, had moved to Novara. The midfielder Rubens Fadini arrived from Gallarate, Dino Ballarin, brother of the goalkeeper Aldo was signed from Chioggia; the Hungarian-Czechoslovakian Július Schubert, a left-sided midfielder; and strikers Emile Bongiorni and Ruggero Grava arrived from Racing Parigi and Roubaix-Tourcoing respectively.
The club began the season after a long tour in Brazil where the team met Palmeiras, Corinthians, São Paulo and Portuguesa, losing only once. During the season, reduced to 24 teams after three promotions and relegations, Ernest Erbstein was appointed as the team's technical director and the Englishman Leslie Lievesley became the coach.
The campaign also saw injuries to Virgilio Maroso, Eusebio Castigliano, Romeo Menti and Sauro Tomà, plus the long suspension for Aldo Ballarin. The Granata, which debuted with a victory against Pro Patria, suffered a defeat in the second round to Atalanta; the team recovered with five straight wins, including that of the derby, but lost again, in Milan, against the Rossoneri.
The club would relinquish the lead in the standings, then recapture it, finishing midway through the season on par with Genoa, from which a third defeat was suffered, losing 3–0. In the return leg of the derby Torino would defeat Juventus 3–0. 
Torino's advantage increased in the standings, gaining a maximum of six point on Inter in second place. However, a pair of draws (in Trieste and Bari) allowed Inter to close the gap within four points from Torino. On 30 April 1949, the two clubs met in Milan, ending 0–0, with Torino approaching their fifth consecutive title (the record would be equaled).
The team travelled to Portugal to play in a friendly against Benfica. However, upon return Torino perished in the Superga air disaster.

Superga air disaster 

The airplane with the team crashed at Basilica di Superga nearby Torino. There were deaths of team chairmen and club workers, baggage men and three of the best journalists  in the country at the time: Renato Casalbore (founder of Tuttosport magazine); Renato Tosatti (from journal Gazzetta del Popolo) and Luigi Cavallero (from journal La Stampa). 
The shocking corpse identification was made by former Italian National Team manager Vittorio Pozzo. The spezzino player Sauro Tomà, injured, did not travel to Lisboa. The following persons in the Torino circle did not travel: second goalkeeper Renato Gandolfi (instead third  goalkeeper Dino Ballarin did), the radio anchor Nicolò Carosio and former manager of Italian National Team also journalist Vittorio Pozzo (Torino preferred to give the seat to Cavallero).

Legacy
The impact of the tragedy in Italy was colossal. An official estimate of about one million persons attended funerals at Piazza in the city of Torino to say goodbye to the players and club officials. 
The shock of the tragedy was the main reason for the long travel on boat across the Atlantic Ocean by Italian National Team to play the 1950 FIFA World Cup in Brazil rather than use an airplane.
Rebuilding of Torino as a competitive squad lasted a long term and could not win another championship until 1976.

List of victims 
Players
 Valerio Bacigalupo
 Aldo Ballarin
 Dino Ballarin
 Émile Bongiorni
 Eusebio Castigliano
 Rubens Fadini
 Guglielmo Gabetto
 Ruggero Grava
 Giuseppe Grezar
 Ezio Loik
 Virgilio Maroso
 Danilo Martelli
 Valentino Mazzola(Captain)
 Romeo Menti
 Piero Operto
 Franco Ossola
 Mario Rigamonti
 Július Schubert
Club officials
 Arnaldo Agnisetta
 Ippolito Civalleri
 Andrea Bonaiuti (coordinator of team travels)
Managers
 Egri Erbstein
 Leslie Lievesley
 Osvaldo Cortina (physical)
Journalists
 Renato Casalbore
 Renato Tosatti
 Luigi Cavallero
Baggage Men
 Pierluigi Meroni
 Celeste D'Inca
 Cesare Biancardi
 Antonio Pangrazi

Squad 

 (Captain)

Youth Squad 
After Superga air disaster, youth squad (primavera)  disputed the last four round of the competition: they are not considered title winners due to Italian Federation (FIGC) actually assigned the championship to  the senior squad.

Transfers

Competitions

Serie A

League table

Matches

Statistics

Squad Statistics

Players statistics 
Numbers of Youth squad in cursive.

Appearances
34.Guglielmo Gabetto 
32.Valerio Bacigalupo 
32.Aldo Ballarin 
31.Mario Rigamonti 
30.Valentino Mazzola 
29.Romeo Menti 
28.Ezio Loik 
28.Danilo Martelli
25.Franco Ossola
21.Giuseppe Grezar 
21.Eusebio Castigliano 
18.Virgilio Maroso 
11.Piero Operto 
10.Rubens Fadini 
8.Emile Bongiorni 
8.Luigi Giuliano 
3.Mario Audisio 
2.Alfio Balbiano
1.Piero Bersia
2.Pietro Biglino 
3.Oscar Ferrari 
4.Andrea Francone 
2.Renato Gandolfi 
4.Antonio Gianmarinaro 
1.Ruggero Grava 
4.Sergio Lussu 
3.Lando Macchi 
4.Giuseppe Marchetto 
4.Sergio Mari 
4.Umberto Motto 
5.Julius Schubert 
2.Sauro Tomà 
4.Guido VandoneGoalscorers
16.Valentino Mazzola 
11.Franco Ossola 
9.Ezio Loik 
9.Romeo Menti 
8.Guglielmo Gabetto 
1.Mario Audisio 
1.Aldo Ballarin 
2.Emile Bongiorni 
1.Eusebio Castigliano 
1.Rubens Fadini 
1.Andrea Francone 
2.Antonio Gianmarinaro 
4.Luigi Giuliano 
3.Giuseppe Grezar 
2.Sergio Lussu 
5.Giuseppe Marchetto'' 
1.Mario Rigamonti 
1.Julius Schubert

References

External links

See also
 Grande Torino

Torino F.C. seasons
Torino
Italian football championship-winning seasons